Rhododendron jasminiflorum is a rhododendron species native to Malacca and Mount Ophir in the Malay Peninsula.

References

 Bot. Mag. 76: t. 4524 1850.

jasminiflorum